RBK Daily is a general business newspaper published in Moscow, Russia.

History and profile
RBK Daily was started in October 2006. The paper is part of RosBusinessConsulting and is published by the company in cooperation with the German publishing group Handelsblatt. The daily has its headquarters in Moscow.

RBK Daily is published full-color unlike most of newspapers published in Russia and other business papers.

References

External links
 
  

2006 establishments in Russia
Business newspapers
Mass media in Moscow
Publications established in 2006
Russian-language newspapers published in Russia